The Roman Catholic Diocese of Hongdong/Hungtung  is a diocese located in the city of Hongdong in the Ecclesiastical province of Taiyuan. It is centered in the Chinese province of Shanxi.

History
 June 17, 1932: Established as Apostolic Prefecture of Hongdong from the Apostolic Vicariate of Luanfu
 April 18, 1950: Promoted as Diocese of Hongdong

Leadership
 Bishops of Hongdong 
(Roman rite)
Bishop Peter Liu Gen-zhu (22 December 2020 - Present)
 Bishop Joseph Sun Yuanmo (November 7, 1920–February 23, 2006)
 Bishop Francis Han Tingbi (April 18, 1950–December 21, 1991)
 Prefects Apostolic of Hongdong (Roman Rite)
 Bishop Francis Han Tingbi (1949–April 18, 1950)
 Fr. Joseph Gao Zong-han (Kao) (1942–November 14, 1944)
 Fr. Peter Cheng Yu-tang (Tch’eng) (May 24, 1932–1942)

References

 GCatholic.org
 Catholic Hierarchy

Roman Catholic dioceses in China
Christian organizations established in 1932
Roman Catholic dioceses and prelatures established in the 20th century
Religion in Shanxi